Metamorphosis is a 2019 Philippine coming-of-age drama film directed by J.E. Tiglao, starring Gold Azeron, Iana Bernardez, Yayo Aguila, Germaine De Leon and Ricky Davao.

Cast
 Gold Azeron as Adam
 Iana Bernardez as Angel
 Yayo Aguila as Elena
 Germaine De Leon as Dr. Abraham
 Ricky Davao as Edgar
 Dylan Ray Talon as Supot
 Bodjie Pascua as Dr. Mortis
 Lui Manansala as Principal
 Sarah Pagcaliwagan as Mrs. Dimasalang

Release
The film premiered at the Cinema One Originals Film festival on 8 November 2019.

Reception
Jason Tan Liwag of Little White Lies called the film a "landmark of intersex representation in Philippine cinema."

Brian Bromberger of Bay Area Reporter wrote that while the film "can be a bit preachy", it "courageously integrates a faithful understanding embrace of intersex that applies to all queer people." Bromberger also praised Azeron's performance, writing that he is "able to convey both vulnerability and fearlessness."

Julia Allende of PEP.ph wrote that while the film "feels a little bit rushed", it "deals with an otherwise uncomfortable phenomenon in a light-handed and humorous manner, reflecting the mindset of a teenage boy at a crossroads", and "does not shy away from the rude portrayal of sexual awakening, fully embracing its awkwardness and messiness."

Randy Myers of The Mercury News called it a "powerful film that is just a tad too neat in its resolution."

References

External links
 
 

Philippine coming-of-age drama films
2010s coming-of-age drama films